Renyer Luan de Oliveira Damasceno (born 12 July 2003), simply known as Renyer, is a Brazilian footballer who plays for Santos as a forward.

Club career

Santos
Born in Rio de Janeiro, Renyer represented Fluminense and Flamengo's futsal teams before joining Santos' youth setup in 2013, aged ten. On 20 December 2019, after lengthy negotiations, he signed his first professional contract with the club.

On 29 January 2020, Renyer was inscribed in the year's Campeonato Paulista, and was called up to the main squad for a match against Inter de Limeira by new manager Jesualdo Ferreira. He made his first team debut on the following day, coming on as a second-half substitute for Tailson in the 2–0 home win; aged 16 years and 206 days, he became the fifth youngest ever debutant in the club's history.

In March 2020, Renyer suffered a serious knee injury while training with the under-17 national team, being sidelined for six months. He made his Série A debut the following 26 January, replacing fellow youth graduate Marcos Leonardo in a 0–2 away loss against Atlético Mineiro.

In 2021, after being rarely used, Renyer returned to the under-20 squad.

International career
After representing Brazil under-15s in 2018, Renyer was called up to the under-17s in March 2019, for the year's Montaigu Tournament. He appeared in Brazil's all four matches of the competition, scoring once against France on 20 April.

On 12 February 2021, Renyer and Santos teammate Marcos Leonardo were called up to the under-18s.

Career statistics

References

External links
Santos FC profile 
DNA Sports profile 

2003 births
Living people
Footballers from Rio de Janeiro (city)
Brazilian footballers
Association football forwards
Campeonato Brasileiro Série A players
Santos FC players
Brazil youth international footballers